The 2020–21 South Dakota State Jackrabbits men's basketball team represented South Dakota State University in the 2020–21 NCAA Division I men's basketball season. The Jackrabbits, led by second-year head coach Eric Henderson, played their home games at Frost Arena in Brookings, South Dakota, as members of the Summit League.

Previous season
The Jackrabbits finished the 2019–20 season 22–10, 13–3 in Summit League play to finish in a tie for the Summit League regular season championship. As the #2 seed in the Summit League tournament, they were upset in the quarterfinals by #7 seed Purdue Fort Wayne.

Roster

Schedule and results

|-
!colspan=12 style=| Non-conference regular season

|-
!colspan=9 style=| Summit League regular season

|-
!colspan=9 style=| Summit League tournament

|-

Source

References

South Dakota State Jackrabbits men's basketball seasons
South Dakota State Jackrabbits
South Dakota State Jackrabbits men's basketball
South Dakota State Jackrabbits men's basketball